Pendle Hill is in the east of Lancashire, England, near the towns of Burnley, Nelson, Colne, Brierfield, Clitheroe and Padiham. It gives its name to the Borough of Pendle. It is an isolated hill in the Pennines, separated from the South Pennines to the east, the Bowland Fells to the northwest, and the West Pennine Moors to the south. It is included in a detached part of the Forest of Bowland Area of Outstanding Natural Beauty.

History
The name "Pendle Hill" combines the words for hill from three different languages (as does Bredon Hill in Worcestershire). In the 13th century it was called Pennul or Penhul, apparently from the Cumbric pen and Old English hyll, both meaning "hill". The modern English "hill" was appended later, after the original meaning of Pendle had become opaque.

A Bronze Age burial site has been discovered at the summit of the hill.

There is an ancient local legend that the Devil once jumped from Hameldon Hill to an outcrop overlooking Sabden, on the southwest slope of Pendle, leaving footprints in the sandstone. Here he gathered rocks in an apron, and after proceeding the short distance to Apronfull, threw a boulder aimed at Clitheroe Castle. At that moment the apron string broke causing the boulder to land near Pendleton and creating the pile of rocks atop the slight prominence there.

The hill is famous for its links to three events which took place in the 17th century: the Pendle witch trials (1612), Richard Towneley's barometer experiment (1661), and the vision of George Fox (1652), which led to the foundation of the Religious Society of Friends (Quaker) movement.

Quakers
In his autobiography, George Fox said he had a vision on Pendle Hill in 1652, during the early years of the Quakers:

Pendle continues to be linked to the Quakers, who take pilgrimage there and use the name for the Pendle Hill Quaker Center for Study and Contemplation near Philadelphia, Pennsylvania.

Witches and the supernatural
The story of the Pendle witches is a notorious and well-documented example of cases brought against alleged witches in 17th-century England.

The area is popular with ghost hunters after Living channel's show Most Haunted visited it for a live investigation on Halloween 2004.  The show's presenter, Yvette Fielding, said it was the scariest episode they had made.

Pendle Hill was the subject of episode 12 of the "How Haunted?" podcast.

Pendle Hill and the surrounding area are the setting for 1951's classic Mist Over Pendle by Robert Neill, and also for the fourth book in Joseph Delaney's The Wardstone Chronicles, called The Spook's Battle.

"The Witchfinders", the eighth episode of the eleventh series of the British science fiction television programme Doctor Who, takes place during the 17th-century Pendle witch trials.

To mark the 400th anniversary, in January 2012 local artist Philippe Handford created a huge installation by putting '1612' on the side of Pendle Hill using  of horticultural fleece.

Geography

Topography
Pendle Hill is separated from the nearby main bulk of the Bowland Fells by the River Ribble. This isolation means that Pendle Hill is in fact the most prominent child summit of Kinder Scout, far away in the Peak District, rather than a child of Ward's Stone, the highest point in Bowland.

Pendle Water, which runs through Ogden Clough, has its source on the summit plateau, heading southwest before turning back to the east as it falls into the Ogden valley. It joins the Lancashire Calder near Burnley, a few miles upstream from the confluence with Sabden Brook, which drains the southwest slopes of the hill. Mearley Brook cuts a large clough onto the northwest face, with its tributaries and those of Pendleton Brook draining this side directly into the River Ribble.

Geology
The sloping plateau summit of Pendle Hill is formed from the Pendle Grit, a coarse Carboniferous age sandstone assigned to the Millstone Grit Group. It overlies a thick sequence of Carboniferous Limestone beds. In chronostratigraphy, the British sub-stage of the Carboniferous period, the 'Pendleian' derives its name from Pendle Hill where an exposure in Light Clough is taken as the type locality.

Much of the lower slopes are mantled by thick deposits of glacial till or boulder clay dating from the last ice age. The historic decomposition of sphagnum moss on the hill has led to it being covered in peat.

The steep slopes of its eastern and southern flanks have given rise to a series of landslips.

See also

 Forest of Pendle
 Pendelfin, a Burnley-based stoneware company named after Pendle Hill
 Pendle Way
 Lancashire Witches Walk

References

Citations

Bibliography

External links

 A circuit of Pendle Hill from Barley
 Computer generated summit panorama Pendle Hill index
 Images of Pendle hill on Flickr
 Live webcam view of Pendle Hill
 Devil's apronful, Pendle Hill

Hills of the Forest of Bowland
Geography of the Borough of Pendle
Marilyns of England
Mountains and hills of Lancashire
Geography of Ribble Valley
Quakerism in England